The Dansirit Formation is a geological formation in Iran. It is Middle Jurassic in age, dating from the Aalenian to Bajocian.

Description 
It is part of the Shemshak Group, a Late Triassic to Callovian set of coal bearing largely fluvo-lacustrine sediments up to 4000 metres thick located within the Alborz Mountains. The outcrop of sediments is strongly controlled by numerous fault structures in the region. The formation predominantly consists of sandstone, with subordinate siltstone and shale. Dinosaur tracks are known from the formation, including sauropods, and tridactlyl and didactyl theropods. A diverse fossil flora is also known from the formation.

References 

Geologic formations of Iran
Jurassic System of Asia
Middle Jurassic Asia
Aalenian Stage
Bajocian Stage
Sandstone formations
Fluvial deposits
Lacustrine deposits
Ichnofossiliferous formations
Paleontology in Iran